A-WA (Arabic for Yes) is an Israeli band made up of the three sisters Tair, Liron, and Tagel Haim. Their single "Habib Galbi" (Love of My Heart) became a global hit, with its Yemenite traditional music mixed with hip hop and electronic music.

History
The Haim sisters grew up in the community settlement of Shaharut, a village of about thirty families in the Arava Valley desert of southern Israel, to a father of Yemenite Jewish origin and a mother of mixed Ukrainian and Moroccan Jewish heritage. Their paternal grandparents are originally from Sana'a and were brought to Israel during Operation Magic Carpet. The Haim sisters spent most of their holidays with their paternal grandparents, singing piyyutim, traditional liturgical poems in Hebrew and Aramaic, as well as traditional Yemenite songs in Arabic sung by women.
Tair has a BA in music from Levinsky College of Education in Tel Aviv, while Liron is an architect and Tagel is a graphic designer and illustrator. They also have two younger sisters, Shir and Tzlil, and a brother, Evyatar, who is a sound technician and was involved in the production of the album Habib Galbi.

The trio was discovered by Tomer Yosef, the lead singer of Balkan Beat Box, to whom they sent a demo of "Habib Galbi", a traditional Yemenite melody sung in the Yemenite dialect of Judeo-Arabic. He showed the demo to a few elder Yemenite women, who mistook the sisters for actual singers from Yemen. The music video went viral in the Muslim World, especially in Yemen, and became the first ever song in Arabic to hit No. 1 on the Israeli pop charts.

A-WA have released two studio albums to date, Habib Galbi (2016) and
Bayti Fi Rasi (2019).

Musical style
During their childhood, the three sisters listened to many different kinds of music, including Greek, jazz, R&B, hip hop, reggae, and progressive rock, but their major source of inspiration has been the traditional Yemenite songs heard at their paternal grandparents' home. Their music follows the same trend as did Ofra Haza, their main inspiration, decades ago, mixing in this case traditional Yemenite folk music with electronic tunes, reggae, and hip hop, which they call "yemenite folk n' beat".

The trio also cites psychedelic rock, including Deep Purple and Pink Floyd, as influential in their music.

Discography
 Habib Galbi (2016)
 Bayti Fi Rasi (2019)

See also
 Music of Israel

References

External links
 
 Review of Habib Galbi at NPR
 

Israeli electronic musicians
All-female bands
Sibling musical trios
Yemenite Jews
Yemeni women singers